Volta was a touring circus show by the Cirque du Soleil and was based on extreme sports; the principal character is a game-show host named Waz.

It is the company's 41st production since 1984, and its 18th show presented under the Big Top. The director of creation is Jean Guibert; Bastien Alexandre is writer and director.

Story
According to the booklet for the show's soundtrack, Waz is the host of a game show, Quid Pro Quo, where people called Greys compete to become Elites. He lost touch with his inner soul in the pursuit of fame. After meeting Ela, the chief of a group called Free Spirits, Waz sets out on a journey he does not expect. Throughout his adventure, Waz becomes enlightened by memories from his childhood as he encounters the Free Spirits who open the doors to the inner soul that Waz has long kept shut and find his free.

Acts
Acts include:

 Mr. Wow Show: Rope skipping (and more)
 Precision walk, roller skates, and hand to hand on unicycle
 Acro lamp
 Trampowall
 Flatland BMX & ballet duo
 Swiss rings/bungee
 Acrobatic ladders
 Shape diving
 Hair suspension
 Aerial straps
 Contemporary dance
 BMX

Acts in rotation
 Aerial hoop (in rotation with hair suspension)

Retired acts

 Rope duo
 Tightwire
 Trials bike
 B-ball
 Parkour
 Baton twirling

Music
Anthony Gonzalez, from the French music band M83, was asked to write the musical score. The soundtrack was released on 20 September 2017 in digital format and on streaming services.

Vocalists

 Darius Harper - From April 2017 (Montreal) to March 8, 2020 (Los Angeles, CA)
 Camilla Bäckman - From April 2017 (Montreal) to March 8, 2020 (Los Angeles, CA)

Incidents

Death of Yann Arnaud 
On March 17, 2018, aerialist Yann Arnaud died of injuries sustained when he fell 20 feet during an aerial straps performance in Tampa Bay, Florida. Planned performances in Tampa Bay and New Jersey were cancelled.

Tour
The show began its Grand Chapiteau tour in North America in its newly designed white and grey big top designed to help reduce environmental impact by reducing heat penetration into the tent.

A show in Redmond was cancelled due to an equipment malfunction.

Impact of the COVID-19 pandemic 
On March 2020, Cirque du Soleil suspended all of its 44 active shows worldwide due to the COVID-19 pandemic, which brought the company into a state of financial collapse with a debt of over $1 billion.  
Even though the company was able to come back and reopen many of its shows, other shows, including Axel, Totem, and Volta were permanently closed.

Volta performed its last show in Los Angeles, CA on March 8, 2020.

References

External links
Official site

Cirque du Soleil touring shows